Bellefontaine Conservation Area consists of  in St. Louis County, Missouri. It is located along Interstate 270 in Castle Point. 

Bellefontaine Conservation Area is primarily grassland and includes sections of forest and ponds open to fishing. The area was previously owned by the Missouri Department of Mental Health and was transferred to the Missouri Department of Conservation in 1995 because of the unique urban fishing opportunities it provides.

References

Protected areas established in 1995
Protected areas of St. Louis County, Missouri
Conservation Areas of Missouri